Front Lines is a 1994 computer wargame for MS-DOS developed and published by Impressions Games.

Gameplay
Front Lines is a wargame with a turn-based play system, using vehicles.

Reception

In PC Gamer US, William R. Trotter called Front Lines "a well-designed product that should have wide appeal." Next Generations reviewer was negative toward the game, and stated that "[m]ost fans of war games will find Front Lines a good example of the genre (if a little predictable), but everyone else's eyes will surely glaze over after a few minutes of play."

Legacy
Following the completion of Front Lines, Impressions Games began work on a remake focused on the American Civil War. The team drifted away from this concept as development progressed. The project became Robert E. Lee: Civil War General.

Impressions' Jeffrey Fiske later called Front Lines "a high-quality graphics program which, if it had done a little more time in development, would have had much better gameplay."

Reviews
Computer Gaming World (Apr, 1995)
PC Games - Feb, 1995
PC Player - May, 1995
PC Team

References

External links

1994 video games
Computer wargames
DOS games
DOS-only games
Impressions Games games
Turn-based strategy video games